Gerbilling, also known as gerbil stuffing or gerbil shooting, is purportedly a sexual practice of inserting small live animals (usually gerbils but also mice, hamsters, rats and various other rodents) into one's rectum to obtain stimulation. Some variations of reports suggest that the rodent be covered in a psychoactive substance such as heroin prior to being inserted. Yet there are few documents on how this was achieved or enjoyed as all rodents have long nails and teeth for digging or burrowing and naturally try to burrow out of any small spaces.

Overview
According to folklorist Jan Harold Brunvand, accounts of gerbilling were first recorded in 1984 and initially were said to involve a mouse and an unidentified man. In subsequent versions of the story, the animal was a gerbil and the story applied to several male celebrities. Rumors surrounding various male celebrities engaging in gerbilling have become persistent urban legends. A common version of the story involves the actor Richard Gere, and is referenced in various media properties such as Scream, The Simpsons, and The Vicar of Dibley.

As of the mid-1980s, there were no reports in peer-reviewed medical literature describing gerbilling among the variety of rectal foreign objects removed from people's bodies.

Mike Walker, a National Enquirer gossip columnist, spent months attempting to verify the gerbilling rumors about a celebrity. "I've never worked harder on a story in my life," Walker told the Palm Beach Post in 1995. After much investigation, he was unable to find any evidence that a gerbilling incident ever happened: "I'm convinced that it's nothing more than an urban legend."

Dan Savage, a sex-advice columnist who frequently discusses unusual sexual practices, stated in 2013 that he has never received a first-hand or even a second-hand account of the practice.

According to the editors of Snopes.com, gerbilling is an unverified and persistent urban legend.

M Jenny Edwards, an attorney who specialises in "sexual offenses relating to bestiality, zoophilia and zoosexuality", connects the folkloric practise of 'gerbiling' to formicophilia. She defines this as "a form of bestiality, which essentially deals with things crawling on your or in you". However, she acknowledges that she hasn't "personally dealt with a gerbil case, nor read about them".

In popular culture

Larry David in “Curb Your Enthusiasm” has an entire episode (“The Bat Mitzvah”) where he is rumored to practice gerbilling. 

In Season 4 of The Sopranos, Ralph Cifaretto makes a prank call to Paulie Gualtieri's mother, alleging that Paulie was arrested for participating in this practice, along with other offenses.

In the song "Fack" from his 2005 album Curtain Call: The Hits, rapper Eminem recites a verse about gerbilling. "Now see that gerbil, grab that tube / stick it up my butt / let that little rascal nibble on my asshole".

National Lampoon's Christmas Vacation (1989) includes a scene where the character Eddie tells his wife: "Don't forget the rubber sheets and gerbils."

A February 2015 episode of Family Feud featured a woman who immediately answered "a gerbil" when host Steve Harvey asked "Name something a doctor would pull out of a person." The response produced prolonged laughter from the audience and a stunned silence from Harvey; even the other contestant at the podium burst out laughing over her response. The clip of the scene from the episode quickly went viral.

In the "South Park" Season 6 episode "The Death Camp of Tolerance", Mr. Garrison inserts the class gerbil Lemmiwinks into Mr. Slave's anus during class. This starts the episode's B-plot, where Lemmiwinks must make his way through Mr. Slave's intestines and reach his mouth to escape, which he does at the end of the episode.

See also 
 Sodomy
 Zoophilia

References

Further reading 
 
 
 
 
 
 Plaintiffs' Response, Conseco Services, L.L.C., v. Alexander, 2009 WL 2492186 (D.Kan.) (case where former employee created websites that suggested other employees utilized gerbils as a sexual prop). Court Order

External links
 "strange sex some may have known", December 26, 2009: A study of felching and gerbiling in language, culture, and popular imagination

Anal eroticism
Gerbils
Sexual urban legends
Zoophilia